Over the Brooklyn Bridge is a 1984 American romantic comedy film directed and produced by Menahem Golan, written by Arnold Somkin, and starring Elliott Gould. It has the working title of My Darling Shiksa, referring to a Shiksa, a woman outside of the Jewish faith. The film depicts a Jewish man being forced to break up with his gentile girlfriend.

Plot
Alby Sherman is a Jewish man whose father died when he was young. He and his mother run a luncheonette in Brooklyn, but Alby has negotiated the purchase of an upscale restaurant in Manhattan, a project he cannot finance on his own. He asks his wealthy Uncle Benjamin to lend him the money. His uncle imposes only one requirement: he will lend Alby the money, but only if he leaves his "shiksa" (gentile) girlfriend.

Cast
 Elliott Gould as Alby Sherman
 Margaux Hemingway as Elizabeth Anderson
 Sid Caesar as Uncle Benjamin
 Burt Young as Phil
 Shelley Winters as Becky Sherman
 Carol Kane as Cheryl
 Sarah Michelle Gellar as Phil's Daughter (uncredited)
 Robert Gossett as Eddie

Production
The film was budgeted at $4 million and scheduled for six weeks. Golan completed it in five weeks, $500,000 under budget.

See also
 List of films featuring diabetes

References

External links
 
 
 
 

1984 films
Films set in New York City
Films set in Brooklyn
Films about Jews and Judaism
Golan-Globus films
1984 romantic comedy films
Films directed by Menahem Golan
Films scored by Pino Donaggio
American romantic comedy films
Metro-Goldwyn-Mayer films
United Artists films
Films produced by Menahem Golan
American interfaith romance films
Films produced by Yoram Globus
1980s English-language films
1980s American films